Maxime Fulgenzy (born 26 June 1934) is a French former footballer who played as a forward. He made one appearance for the France national team in 1961.

References

External links
 

1934 births
Living people
French footballers
Association football forwards
France international footballers
Ligue 1 players
CS Sedan Ardennes players
Olympique de Marseille players
Sportspeople from Ardennes (department)
Footballers from Grand Est